Swansea Vale is a  mixed used new suburb development site in Swansea, Wales.  The area is bounded east by Birchgrove; south by Swansea Enterprise Park, west by the River Tawe and north by the M4 motorway.

The development is a partnership between the City and County of Swansea council and the Welsh Assembly Government and will comprise a residential area (Tregof Village), a nature reserve and two business parks - Riverside Business Park and Central Business Park.

The Swansea Vale Nature Reserve consists of 6 hectares of land and is one of the few remaining areas of wetland habitat in Swansea.  The reserve consists of woodland, rivers, ponds and marsh. The reserve is viewable by the public with a footpath and boardwalk built around the southern part of the reserve.

References
BBC South West Wales: Swansea Vale Nature Reserve
City and County of Swansea: Swansea Vale
Welsh Assembly government: Swansea Vale
Swansea Vale Nature Reserve blog

Districts of Swansea
Nature reserves in Swansea
Economy of Swansea